The Oprah Conversation is an interview talk show by Oprah Winfrey that premiered on Apple TV+ on July 30, 2020.

Episodes

Production 
On June 15, 2018, Oprah Winfrey and Apple announced a multi-year partnership, with Winfrey to create exclusive original content for Apple.

On March 25, 2019, Apple hosted keynote event at its California campus to announce the new Apple TV+ subscription service. Winfrey appeared onstage to conclude the event, announcing that she would be producing two documentary series, as well as launching a "book club" in partnership with Apple. The book club ended up being a reboot of a segment from The Oprah Winfrey Show titled Oprah's Book Club, which premiered on November 1, 2020, alongside the launch of Apple TV+.

On July 27, 2020, Apple and Oprah Winfrey announced The Oprah Conversation, with the first two episodes airing on July 30, 2020, on Apple TV+, and following episodes releasing on an irregular schedule.

References

External links 
 – official site
 

2020s American television talk shows
Apple TV+ original programming
Oprah Winfrey